Froilán Varela (1891–1948) was a Uruguayan stage and film actor. He spent most of his life in Argentina, where he appeared in twenty two films including the historical Savage Pampas (1945) for which he won the Silver Condor Award for Best Supporting Actor.

Selected filmography
 The Caranchos of Florida (1938)
 The Road of the Llamas (1942)
 Savage Pampas (1945)

References

Bibliography 
 Finkielman, Jorge. The Film Industry in Argentina: An Illustrated Cultural History. McFarland, 24 Dec 2003.

External links 
 

1891 births
1948 deaths
Uruguayan male film actors
Uruguayan male stage actors
People from Montevideo